Hubert Schwarz (born 13 September 1960, in Oberaudorf) is a former German nordic combined skier who competed during the 1980s. He won the Nordic combined 3 x 10 km team event at the 1988 Winter Olympics in Calgary after having won the gold medal in that same event at the 1985 FIS Nordic World Ski Championships in Seefeld.

External links 
 
 

1960 births
Living people
German male Nordic combined skiers
German male ski jumpers
Nordic combined skiers at the 1980 Winter Olympics
Nordic combined skiers at the 1984 Winter Olympics
Nordic combined skiers at the 1988 Winter Olympics
Ski jumpers at the 1980 Winter Olympics
Olympic ski jumpers of West Germany
Olympic Nordic combined skiers of West Germany
Olympic gold medalists for West Germany
Olympic medalists in Nordic combined
FIS Nordic World Ski Championships medalists in Nordic combined
Medalists at the 1988 Winter Olympics
People from Rosenheim (district)
Sportspeople from Upper Bavaria